A wind vane, weather vane, or weathercock is an instrument used for showing the direction of the wind. It is typically used as an architectural ornament to the highest point of a building. The word vane comes from the Old English word , meaning "flag".

Although partly functional, wind vanes are generally decorative, often featuring the traditional cockerel design with letters indicating the points of the compass. Other common motifs include ships, arrows, and horses. Not all wind vanes have pointers. In a sufficiently strong wind, the head of the arrow or cockerel (or equivalent) will indicate the direction from which the wind is blowing.

Wind vanes are also found on small wind turbines to keep the wind turbine pointing into the wind.

History
The oldest textual reference in China to a weather vane comes from the Huainanzi dating from around 139 BC, which mentions a thread or streamer that another commentator interprets as "wind-observing fan".  The Tower of the Winds on the ancient Greek agora in Athens once bore on its roof a weather vane in the form of a bronze Triton holding a rod in his outstretched hand, rotating as the wind changed direction. Below this was a frieze adorned with the eight Greek wind deities. The eight-metre-high structure also featured sundials, and a water clock inside. It dates from around 50 BC.

Military documents from the Three Kingdoms period of China (220–280) refer to the weather vane as "five ounces", named after the weight of its materials. By the third century, Chinese weather vanes were shaped like birds and took the name of "wind-indicating bird". The , a third-century book written by Miao Changyan about the palaces at Chang'an, describes a bird-shaped weather vane situated on a tower roof.

The oldest surviving weather vane with the shape of a rooster is the Gallo di Ramperto, made in 820 and now preserved in the Museo di Santa Giulia in Brescia, Lombardy.

Pope Leo IV had a cock placed on the Old St. Peter's Basilica or old Constantinian basilica.

Pope Gregory I said that the cock "was the most suitable emblem of Christianity", being the emblem of St Peter, a reference to Luke 22:34 in which Jesus predicts that Peter will deny him three times before the rooster crows.

As a result of this, the rooster gradually began to be used as a weather vane on church steeples, and in the ninth century Pope Nicholas I ordered the figure to be placed on every church steeple.

The Bayeux Tapestry of the 1070s depicts a man installing a cock on Westminster Abbey.

One alternative theory about the origin of weathercocks on church steeples is that it was an emblem of the vigilance of the clergy calling the people to prayer.

Another theory says that the cock was not a Christian symbol but an emblem of the sun derived from the Goths.

A few churches used weather vanes in the shape of the emblems of their patron saints. The City of London has two surviving examples. The weather vane of St Peter upon Cornhill is not in the shape of a rooster, but a key; while St Lawrence Jewry's weather vane is in the form of a gridiron. 

Early weather vanes had very ornamental pointers, but modern weather vanes are usually simple arrows that dispense with the directionals because the instrument is connected to a remote reading station. An early example of this was installed in the Royal Navy's Admiralty building in London – the vane on the roof was mechanically linked to a large dial in the boardroom so senior officers were always aware of the wind direction when they met.

Modern aerovanes combine the directional vane with an anemometer (a device for measuring wind speed). Co-locating both instruments allows them to use the same axis (a vertical rod) and provides a coordinated readout.

World's largest weather vane
According to the Guinness World Records, the world's largest weather vane is a Tío Pepe sherry advertisement located in Jerez, Spain.

A challenger for the title of world's largest weather vane is located in Whitehorse, Yukon. The weather vane is a retired Douglas DC-3 CF-CPY a top a swiveling support. Located at the Yukon Transportation Museum beside Whitehorse International Airport, the weather vane is used by pilots to determine wind direction, used as a landmark by tourists and enjoyed by locals. The weather vane only requires a 5 knot wind to rotate.

A challenger for the world's tallest weather vane is located in Westlock, Alberta. This landmark is located at the Canadian Tractor Museum.

Slang term
The term "weathervane" is also a slang word for a politician who has frequent changes of opinion. The National Assembly of Quebec has banned the use of this slang term as an insult after its use by members of the legislature.

Literary references
 A copper-plated antique weathervane is the subject of the mystery in the children's book/Young Adult book entitled "The Mystery of the Phantom Grasshopper" (Trixie Belden series #18) by Kathryn Kenny, 1977. ISBN 0-307-21589-X. Paperback.

Gallery

See also
 Anemoscope
 Apparent wind indicator, in sailing
 List of weather instruments
 Weather station
 Windsock, in aviation

References

Further reading

External links

Ancient inventions
Articles containing video clips
Greek inventions
Hellenistic engineering
Meteorological instrumentation and equipment
Wind